John E. Williams may refer to:
 John Eddie Williams, American lawyer
 John Edward Williams (1922–1994), American author and academic
 John Edward Williams (activist) or Jack Williams ( – 1917), British socialist activist
 John Elias Williams (1871–1927), American Presbyterian missionary to China
 John Elliot Williams (1920–1988), Canadian politician
 John Elliott Williams or Johnny Williams (1927–2005), American football player
 John Ellis Williams (1924–2008), Welsh novelist

See also 
 John Williams (disambiguation)